John Howell "Bo" Rowland (March 20, 1903 – September 23, 1964) was an American football player and coach of football and basketball. He served as the head football coach at Henderson-Brown College—now Henderson State University (1925–1930), Ouachita Baptist University (1931), The Citadel (1940–1942), Oklahoma City University (1946–1947), and George Washington University (1948–1951), compiling a career college football coaching record of 90–47–7. Rowland was also the head basketball coach at Henderson-Brown from 1925 to 1931 and at Cornell University from 1936 to 1938, tallying a career college basketball coaching mark of 40–58. Rowland died at the age of 61 on September 23, 1964 at a hospital in Little Rock, Arkansas. He was inducted into the Arkansas Sports Hall of Fame in 1968.

Head coaching record

Football

References

External links
 

1903 births
1964 deaths
American football ends
Basketball coaches from Arkansas
Cornell Big Red football coaches
Cornell Big Red men's basketball coaches
George Washington Colonials football coaches
Henderson State Reddies football coaches
Henderson State Reddies football players
Henderson State Reddies men's basketball coaches
Oklahoma City Stars athletic directors
Oklahoma City Chiefs football coaches
Oklahoma Sooners football coaches
Ouachita Baptist Tigers football coaches
Syracuse Orange football coaches
The Citadel Bulldogs athletic directors
The Citadel Bulldogs football coaches
Vanderbilt Commodores football players
Players of American football from Arkansas